Riccardo Burgio (born 5 May 2001) is an Italian professional footballer who plays as a midfielder for  club Monterosi.

Career
Born in Magenta, Lombardy, Burgio started his career in Inter Milan youth system, and in 2019 he joined Atalanta.

On 8 September 2020, he was loaned to Serie C club Avellino. Burgio made his professional debut on 3 October 2020 against Viterbese.

On 6 January 2021, he joined Serie C club Renate on loan.

On 20 July 2021, he was loaned to Piacenza for the 2021–22 season. On 28 January 2022, the loan was terminated early. On 29 January 2022, he joined ACR Messina on loan until the end of the season.

On 22 July 2022, Burgio signed with Monterosi.

References

External links
 

2001 births
Living people
People from Magenta, Lombardy
Footballers from Lombardy
Italian footballers
Association football midfielders
Serie C players
Inter Milan players
Atalanta B.C. players
U.S. Avellino 1912 players
A.C. Renate players
Piacenza Calcio 1919 players
A.C.R. Messina players
Monterosi Tuscia F.C. players
Sportspeople from the Metropolitan City of Milan